The Examiner is the daily newspaper of the city of Launceston and north-eastern Tasmania, Australia.

Overview 
The Examiner was first published on 12 March 1842, founded by James Aikenhead. The Reverend John West was instrumental in establishing the newspaper and was the first editorial writer. At first it was a weekly publication (Saturdays). The Examiner expanded to Wednesdays six months later. In 1853, the paper was changed to tri-weekly (Tuesdays, Thursdays and Saturdays), and first began daily publication on 10 April 1866. This frequency lasted until 16 February the next year. Tri-weekly publication then resumed and continued until 21 December 1877 when the daily paper returned.

Publication of Anti-LGBT Disinformation 
On 9 March 2023, The Examiner published sensationalist anti-transgender claims about invasion of privacy, claiming that a man had undressed in front of children in the female changerooms at City of Launceston Aquatic Centre before being forcibly ejected from the changerooms by another patron.  The article was widely disseminated in anti-transgender groups, including several organizations listed as anti-LGBTI hate groups.  The material was widely used to portray transgender women as a "threat" to other women.  On social media, the article attracted 74,000 comments, the overwhelming majority of which were pejorative, demonising, vilifying of, or threatening violence towards, transgender people.  ABC News (Australia) reported that the Launceston City Council was inundated with "phone calls and emails" from distressed readers as a result of the moral panic.  It subsequently came to light the information was entirely confected.  Addressing the disinformation, Mayor Danny Gibson said, "Disappointingly, the newspaper made no attempt to verify the veracity of the letter with the council."  Several human rights groups condemned the exploitation of a highly vulnerable minority for outrage-bait and "culture wars".

Associated publications  
The Weekly Courier was published in Launceston by the company from 1901 to 1935. Another weekly paper (evening) The Saturday Evening Express was published between 1924 and 1984 when it transformed into The Sunday Examiner a title which continues to this day.

Ownership 
Once owned by ENT Limited, The Examiner was owned by the Rural Press group and is now part of Australian Community Media.

The current editor is Simon Tennant.

Readership
For the 12 months ending September 2008, Roy Morgan Research reports a Saturday readership of 100,000 and a Monday-Friday readership of 84,000.

See also 
 List of newspapers in Australia

References

External links
 The Examiner online

Newspapers published in Tasmania
Newspapers established in 1842
Daily newspapers published in Australia
Launceston, Tasmania
1842 establishments in Australia